Murupara is a town located in the Whakatāne District and Bay of Plenty Region of New Zealand's North Island. The town is situated in an isolated part of the region between the Kaingaroa Forest and Te Urewera protected area, on the banks of the Rangitaiki River, 65 kilometres southeast of Rotorua. Indigenous Māori also make up over 90% of the total population.

It is located on SH38 and is the terminus of the Murupara Railway Branch. The town's principal industries are all related to forestry.

Murupara is in the rohe (tribal area) of the Ngāti Manawa iwi.

The Māori language name  means "to wipe off mud".

History and culture

History

Murupara was previously a staging post on the road between Rotorua and Napier. In the early 1900s, the planting of exotic trees began on the surrounding scrubland. This area is now known as the Kaingaroa Forest, with 1,400 square kilometres of planted pines. As the main service centre for the many forestry workers and their families, Murupara grew to a population of over 3,000. Recent changes to the forestry contracting system have brought about a decrease in the number of permanent residents.

The settlements of Galatea, Horomanga, Kopuriki, Aniwhenua, Waiohau and Murupara lie between the boundary of the Kaingaroa Forest, the popular Te Urewera and Whirinaki Te Pua-a-Tāne Conservation Park. Earlier history is also evident around Murupara. In a rock shelter approximately eight kilometres west of the town centre are a number of ancient cave drawings.

Marae

Murupara has four marae, which are meeting places for Ngāti Manawa hapū:

 Moewhare or Karangaranga marae and Moewhare meeting house are affiliated with Moewhare.
 Painoaiho marae and Ruatapu meeting house are affiliated with Ngāti Koro.
 Rangitahi marae and Apa Hapai Taketake meeting house are affiliated with Ngāti Hui.
 Tīpapa marae and Tangiharuru meeting house are affiliated with Ngāi Tokowaru.

In October 2020, the Government committed $1,327,283 from the Provincial Growth Fund to upgrade the four marae, creating 12 jobs.

Demographics

Murupara had a population of 1,815 at the 2018 New Zealand census, an increase of 144 people (8.6%) since the 2013 census, and a decrease of 57 people (−3.0%) since the 2006 census. There were 549 households, comprising 891 males and 924 females, giving a sex ratio of 0.96 males per female. The median age was 29.1 years (compared with 37.4 years nationally), with 525 people (28.9%) aged under 15 years, 393 (21.7%) aged 15 to 29, 714 (39.3%) aged 30 to 64, and 186 (10.2%) aged 65 or older.

Ethnicities were 20.2% European/Pākehā, 91.2% Māori, 3.3% Pacific peoples, 0.8% Asian, and 0.8% other ethnicities. People may identify with more than one ethnicity.

The percentage of people born overseas was 1.8, compared with 27.1% nationally.

Although some people chose not to answer the census's question about religious affiliation, 40.3% had no religion, 39.3% were Christian, 12.6% had Māori religious beliefs, 0.2% were Buddhist and 0.8% had other religions.

Of those at least 15 years old, 60 (4.7%) people had a bachelor's or higher degree, and 423 (32.8%) people had no formal qualifications. The median income was $18,800, compared with $31,800 nationally. 45 people (3.5%) earned over $70,000 compared to 17.2% nationally. The employment status of those at least 15 was that 420 (32.6%) people were employed full-time, 180 (14.0%) were part-time, and 183 (14.2%) were unemployed.

Education

The school opened in 2000, and was the first Designated Character School (Kura ā-Iwi) in the country.

Notable people

 Jacinda Ardern (born 1980), Prime Minister of New Zealand and leader of the Labour Party
 Pem Bird, president of the Maori Party 2010–2013
 Bradley Iles, professional golfer
 Willie Ripia, Rugby union player

References

Whakatane District
Populated places in the Bay of Plenty Region